Denis Cussen (19 July 1901 – 15 December 1980) was an Irish sprinter, rugby union player and doctor. He competed in the men's 100 metres at the 1928 Summer Olympics.

References

External links
 

1901 births
1980 deaths
Athletes (track and field) at the 1928 Summer Olympics
Irish male sprinters
Olympic athletes of Ireland
Sportspeople from County Limerick
Ireland international rugby union players
Rugby union wings
Rugby union players from County Limerick